Aleksandra Dawidowicz (born 4 February 1987) is a Polish cyclist. She was born in Kalisz. She competed in cross-country at the 2008 Summer Olympics in Beijing, where she placed tenth.  She competed again at the 2012 Summer Olympics, finishing 7th.

References

1987 births
Cross-country mountain bikers
Cyclists at the 2008 Summer Olympics
Cyclists at the 2012 Summer Olympics
Living people
Olympic cyclists of Poland
Polish female cyclists
Sportspeople from Kalisz
21st-century Polish women